The Serra dos Ancares (Spanish: Sierra de los Ancares, also known as Sierra de Ancares) is a mountain range of the Galician Massif in north-west Spain, extending in a south-westerly direction from the western end of the Cantabrian Mountains in Asturias.

Geography
The range forms the boundary between the autonomous communities of Galicia and Castile and León.
Other notable peaks are Mustallar (1,935 m) and Miravalles (1,969 m). The smaller Serra do Courel lies south of this range, stretching parallel to it.

The main trees in the range are willow and European alder close to water courses, as well as chestnut, ash, common hazel, oak and common holly. Above  there is brushland with tree heath and juniper.

This area of Spain contains many isolated rural communities that were largely cut off from the outside world until roads were built in the mid 20th century.  The most significant element of the whole architecture of the area is the palloza or casa teito, stone buildings of ancient origin, with a circular or elliptical plan.

Ecology
Sierra de los Ancares is the name of a Site of Community Importance in the province of León.

Os Ancares Lucenses y Montes de Cervantes, Navia y Becerrea was declared a UNESCO Biosphere Reserve in 2006.
Los Ancares Leoneses is also a biosphere reserve.

See also
 Los Ancares
 Os Ancares

References

External links
Los Ancares, a very special reserve
Valle De Ancares (Ancares Valley)
Sierra de los Ancares

Ancares
Mountain ranges of Castile and León
Mountain ranges of Galicia (Spain)
Bien de Interés Cultural landmarks in the Province of Lugo
Protected areas of Galicia (Spain)